Panoptikum 59 is a 1959 Austrian drama film directed by Walter Kolm-Veltée. It was entered into the 9th Berlin International Film Festival.

Cast
 Michael Heltau – Werner
 Alexander Trojan – Klinger
 Elisabeth Berzobohaty – Kora
 Heiki Eis – Ein junger Mensch
 Paula Elges – Thea Gutwell
 Melanie Horeschowsky – Alte Dame
 Erna Korhel – Mutter Felizitas
 Helmut Kraus – Dr. Schmuck
 Ulla Purr – Felizita
 Herbert Schmid – Schalk
 Alma Seidler

References

External links

1959 films
1950s German-language films
1959 drama films
Austrian black-and-white films
Films directed by Walter Kolm-Veltée
Austrian drama films